Randall Park (born March 23, 1974) is an American actor, comedian, and writer, who is best known for his role as Louis Huang in the ABC sitcom Fresh Off the Boat (2015–2020), for which he was nominated for the Critics' Choice Television Award for Best Actor in a Comedy Series award in 2016.

Before these major roles, Park gained popularity by playing Steve, a prank replacement of Jim Halpert (dubbed "Asian Jim") in an episode of the NBC sitcom The Office and starring in the recurring role of Governor Danny Chung in the HBO comedy series Veep. He also co-starred in and co-wrote the Netflix romantic comedy film Always Be My Maybe (2019), alongside Ali Wong.

He has appeared in numerous web series on Channel 101, including Dr. Miracles and IKEA Heights. He has also appeared in a few short films by Wong Fu Productions.

Park also appears in the Marvel Cinematic Universe as Agent Jimmy Woo in the film Ant-Man and the Wasp (2018), the miniseries WandaVision (2021), and the film Ant-Man and the Wasp: Quantumania (2023), as a future version of himself in the 2021 Dwayne Johnson autobiographical comedy series Young Rock, and in the DC Extended Universe film Aquaman (2018) as Dr. Stephen Shin.

Early life
Park was born to Korean immigrants in Los Angeles, California and grew up in Castle Heights, Los Angeles. His mother was an accountant at University of California, Los Angeles (UCLA) and his father owned a one-hour photo store. Park graduated from Hamilton High School's humanities magnet program.

Park began attending UCLA in winter quarter of 1993. As a student, he co-founded "Lapu, the Coyote that Cares," the largest and longest-running on-campus Asian American theater company, now known as the LCC Theatre Company, in 1995. He credits his experiences with LCC for sparking his desire to pursue acting professionally and would go on to collaborate with many of its alumni. Their first performance was of Treehouse Bachelor Society, a full-length play Park had written, and it was performed at the Northwest Auditorium. Park was also a student volunteer for UCLA's official charity, UCLA UniCamp, and went by the camp name "CareMoose."

He graduated with a bachelor's degree in English, with a concentration in creative writing, and minor in Asian American studies from UCLA in 1997. He remained at UCLA, partly to continue acting with LCC, and later completed his master's degree in Asian American studies in 1999. After graduation, Park worked at the weekly newspaper New Times LA as a graphic/print designer for a few years. When he left the job, he considered pursuing architecture school but failed the pre-requisite courses and realized he did not want to attend any more schooling.

Career 
Park has made guest appearances on television shows including Community, Curb Your Enthusiasm, New Girl, The Office, ER, CSI: Crime Scene Investigation, Four Kings, Las Vegas, House, iCarly, Cold Case, The Mindy Project, and Reno 911!.

2001–2006: Early years 
He co-founded the Propergander theater group with a few LCC alumni. Their first production was of The Achievers by LCC co-founder Michael Golamco in 2001. Around this time, Park began doing stand-up comedy recreationally in his backyard during Propergander shows. He cited Mike Birbiglia and Mitch Hedberg as early influences and would later perform alongside comedian Ali Wong. Other notable alumni include Vivian Bang, Tim Chiou, and Eddie Shin. Park, Shin, and LCC co-founder Naoya Imanishi were also a part of the short lived improv group, "The Legendary Stage Ninjaz," along with comedian Ali Wong.

Park made his screen debut as the lead in the 2003 short film Dragon of Love, which won Best Short Film at the 2003 Hawaii International Film Festival.

Park co-wrote and starred in the feature film American Fusion, directed by UCLA alumnus Frank Lin, which won the Audience Award at the 2005 Hawaii International Film Festival. It was actor Pat Morita's last role before his death in November of that year. The script was a quarter-finalist for the 2009 Nicholl Fellowships in Screenwriting.

Early in his career, when Park did not have a talent agent, he would book roles through diversity showcases at different television networks. In 2006, he was featured in the CBS Diversity Showcase. At 32, while a cast member on MTV's Wild 'n Out, he worked at Starbucks to supplement his income.

In 2007, he regularly appeared as an actor in the filmmaking reality show On the Lot.

2007–2013: Online work 
Park found work to be scarce in 2009 due to the Great Recession in the United States in 2008 and a potential SAG-AFTRA strike at the beginning of 2009, so he began to focus on his own projects during this period. He wrote the short film Blueberry, which won an award for Best Actor at the NBC Shortcuts Film Festival For Short Films in 2010.

Park had a recurring role as Martin Fukanaga on Supah Ninjas.

Park has collaborated on several projects with Wong Fu Productions. Previously, he has appeared as Brandon in the comedy skit Too Fast (2010) and the stepfather in the web series Home Is Where the Hans Are (2012). More recently, Park played a D.E.I. agent in the feature film Everything Before Us (2015) and its accompanying short film, Asian Santa in the comedy skit Why is Santa Asian?, and a brief cameo as himself in Asian Bachelorette 2.

He created, directed, wrote, and starred in several short internet series for Channel 101, including Dr. Miracles, The Food, IKEA Heights, and Dumb Professor. In 2013 he wrote and starred in a series for Channel 101 featuring his baby daughter entitled Baby Mentalist. In Channel 101's bracket competition format for web-series, Baby Mentalist was voted number one the most times of any show at the time, ending with six episodes in 2013.

2014–present: Mainstream success 
Park played the recurring character of Minnesota governor Danny Chung on the HBO comedy Veep.

In 2014, Park played a company rep trying to recruit college students in Neighbors. He had previously worked with the director, Nicholas Stoller, on The Five-Year Engagement (2012). Stoller later recommended Park for the role of "a vague North Korean dictator," who later turned out to be North Korean leader Kim Jong-un, in the controversial film, The Interview, directed by Evan Goldberg and Seth Rogen. Impressed by his audition, Goldberg and Rogen offered Park the role after one audition. Park gained over 20 pounds for the role. For reference material on the role, he used Forest Whitaker's performance in The Last King of Scotland and the Vice documentary on North Korea.

That year, he also co-starred in the Jason Segel/Cameron Diaz comedy, Sex Tape.

In 2015, he appeared as Jeff in the prequel 2015 series for Netflix, Wet Hot American Summer: First Day of Camp. He also appeared in Wong Fu Productions' first feature film, Everything Before Us. Park appeared with John Malkovich in the music video for Eminem's single "Phenomenal". He also appeared as a co-worker of Amy Schumer's character in Trainwreck. He also had roles in the films Southpaw (as Jed Wang) and The Night Before as Ethan's Boss.

From 2015 to 2020, Park starred as Louis Huang, patriarch of a Taiwanese American family, alongside Constance Wu, in ABC's television show Fresh Off the Boat (based on Eddie Huang's memoir, Fresh Off the Boat: A Memoir), written and produced by Nahnatchka Khan and executive produced by Jake Kasdan. He was the first actor cast on the show, with the producers having approached him before the pilot was ordered. Park initially felt uneasy about portraying a Taiwanese father as somebody of Korean heritage. However, Huang reassured Park that he was Huang's first choice to play his father. When they were staffing the writer's room, Park recommended Ali Wong for the position. The show ran for six seasons and was concluded on February 21, 2020.

In 2016, Park appeared in the film Office Christmas Party as Fred.

In 2017 appeared in the comedies The House as the Wall Street Guy and The Disaster Artist. He also lent his voice talents to the CGI animated film The Lego Ninjago Movie as Chen the Cheerleader.

In 2018, Park had minor roles in both the Marvel Cinematic Universe and DC Extended Universe (DCEU). He played FBI Agent Jimmy Woo in the Marvel Studios film Ant-Man and the Wasp. Park returned as Woo in the Disney+ series, WandaVision (2021). In the DCEU, he played Dr. Stephen Shin in the film Aquaman.

Park produced and starred in the Netflix original film Always Be My Maybe, directed by Fresh of the Boat creator Nahnatchka Khan, with Ali Wong. The film was written by Park, Wong, and Michael Golamco. The in-film hip hop band, Hello Peril, is inspired by Park's 90s hip hop band, Ill Again. The film was released in select theaters on May 29, 2019, and digitally on May 31, 2019, on Netflix.

Park, Golamco, and Hieu Ho launched the Asian American focused production company, Imminent Collision, and signed a first look deal with 20th Century Fox Television in October 2019. The name is derived from a play they worked on while members of the LCC theater group at UCLA.

In 2021, Park was announced as starring in the upcoming Netflix comedy series Blockbuster. In January 2023, Park's directorial debut, Shortcomings, premiered at the 2023 Sundance Film Festival.

Other works
Park was a front man for the San Francisco Bay Area hip-hop/jazz/rock fusion band, Ill Again. The band served as the inspiration for his character's band, Hello Peril, in the film Always Be My Maybe (2019). He later formed the rap group Novelists with former Ill Again emcee Andrew Johnson. In this group, Park went by the rap name, "Randruff."<ref>{{Cite web|url=https://myspace.com/article/2015/3/6/fresh-off-the-boat-randall-park-hip-hop-past|title='Fresh Off the Boats Randall Park's 7 Best Hip-Hop Moments|last=Lee|first=Christina|date=March 6, 2015|website=Myspace|access-date=2020-02-14}}</ref> They released the album Bookends in 2008.

Park has been featured in ads for HBO Go, Ally Financial, and the 2011 Father's Day Verizon Droid commercial. He plays a "doggie daycare owner" in a print and online campaign for Chase Bank, which aired in early 2015.

Park was featured in UTC Business Ethics Course HUR750 "Respect in the Workplace".

 Personal life 
Park is married to actress Jae Suh Park. They worked together on The Mindy Project and the short film Love, NY. They live with their daughter Ruby in the San Fernando Valley.

Park returned to UCLA as a keynote speaker for the Asian American Studies department commencement ceremony in 2015 and for English department commencement ceremony in 2017.

Park and Jae Suh's daughter, Ruby Louise Park, was born in 2012.  Ruby Louise starred, alongside her parents, as a crime-fighting baby superhero in Baby Mentalist, a comedy web series developed by her father in 2013.  Ruby Louise is autistic, as discussed by Park on Mike Birbiglia's podcast Working it Out.  Park supports the non-profit KultureCity that focuses on "sensory accessibility and acceptance for those with invisible disabilities."  Park is on KultureCity's board of Directors.

Park is an active supporter of East West Players theater group in Little Tokyo, Los Angeles. He has publicly voiced his support of the theatre during EWP's donation campaign in 2018.

Park has an older brother. In the beginning, Park's parents were not supportive of his acting ambitions. However, in hindsight, Park has acknowledged that they have supported him tacitly by continuing to house him throughout the years. When Park received the script for The Interview, his parents encouraged him to pursue the role.

Filmography
Film

{| class="wikitable plainrowheaders sortable"
!scope="col" | Year
!scope="col" | Title
!scope="col" class="unsortable" | Role
!scope="col" class="unsortable" | Notes
|-
| rowspan=2| 2005
! scope="row"| Will Unplugged| Kevin
| 
|-
! scope="row"| American Fusion| Josh
|
|-
| 2007
! scope="row"| Universal Remote| The Sick Man / Asian Father
|
|-
| 2008
! scope="row"| Fix| Sam
|
|-
| rowspan=2| 2009
! scope="row"| The People I've Slept With| Carlton Kim
|
|-
! scope="row"| Winged Creatures| Resident
|
|-
| rowspan="2" |2010
! scope="row"| Dinner for Schmucks| Henderson
|
|-
! scope="row"| The 41 Year Old Virgin Who Knocked Up Sarah Marshall and Felt Superbad About It| Officer Yo Ass
|
|-
| rowspan=3| 2011
! scope="row"| Larry Crowne| Trainee Wong
|
|-
! scope="row"| Our Footloose Remake| Ren McCormack
|
|-
! scope="row"| The Good Doctor| Clerk
|
|-
| 2012
! scope="row"| The Five Year Engagement| Ming
|
|-
| rowspan="4"| 2014
! scope="row"| Neighbors| Rep
| rowspan=2| Cameo
|-
! scope="row"| Sex Tape| Edward
|-
! scope="row"| They Came Together| Martinson
|
|-
! scope="row"| The Interview| Kim Jong-un
|
|-
| rowspan="5"| 2015
! scope="row"| Trainwreck| Bryson
|
|-
! scope="row"| The Meddler| Officer Lee
|
|-
! scope="row"| Everything Before Us| Randall
|
|-
! scope="row"| The Night Before| Ethan's Boss
|
|-
! scope="row"| Amigo Undead| Kevin Ostrowski
|
|-
| rowspan="2"| 2016
! scope="row"| The Hollars| Dr. Fong
|
|-
! scope="row"| Office Christmas Party| Fred
|
|-
| rowspan="5"| 2017
! scope="row"| The Disaster Artist| Rob
|
|-
! scope="row"| Snatched| Michael
|
|-
! scope="row"| The House| Buckler
|
|-
! scope="row"| The Lego Ninjago Movie| Chen the Cheerleader (voice)
|
|-
! scope="row"| Dismissed| Mr. Sheldon
|
|-
| rowspan="3"| 2018
! scope="row"| The Samurai of Tsushima| Ganpei (voice)
|
|-
! scope="row"| Ant-Man and the Wasp| Jimmy Woo
|
|-
! scope="row"| Aquaman| Dr. Stephen Shin
|
|-
| rowspan="3" | 2019
! scope="row"| Long Shot| Boss
|
|-
! scope="row"| Always Be My Maybe
| Marcus Kim
| Writer, producer
|-
! scope="row"| Straight Up
| Wallace
|
|-
| 2020
! scope="row"| Valley Girl
| Principal Evans
|
|-
| 2021
! scope="row"| PAW Patrol: The Movie
| Butch (voice)
|
|-
| 2022
! scope="row"| The People We Hate at the Wedding
| Russell
|
|-
| rowspan="3" | 2023
| scope="row"| Ant-Man and The Wasp: Quantumania
| Jimmy Woo
| Cameo
|-
| style="background:#FFFFCC;"| Strays 
| Hunter (voice)
|
|- 
| style="background:#FFFFCC;"| Aquaman and the Lost Kingdom 
| Dr. Stephen Shin
|
|}

Television

Music videos

Web series

Select awards and recognition 

 2010 – Best Actor Award at NBC's Short Cuts Film Festival.
2011 – Coalition of Asian Pacifics in Entertainment New Writers Award for the pilot Erasists
 2015 – Asian Pacific Alumni Alumnus of the Year Award
2015 – V3Con Visibility Award
 2016 – Edward A. Dickson Alumnus of the Year
2017 – Visionary Award by East West Players (EWP)
2022 – Children's and Family Emmy Award for Outstanding Guest Performance (Nominated)

References

External links

 
 
 Comedy Zen

1974 births
American male actors of Korean descent
Male actors from Los Angeles
American male comedians
American male film actors
American male television actors
American people of South Korean descent
Living people
University of California, Los Angeles alumni
American writers of Korean descent
21st-century American male actors
American television writers
American male television writers
Comedians from California
Screenwriters from California
21st-century American comedians
21st-century American screenwriters
American comedians of Asian descent
21st-century American male writers